Carl Gregor Herzog zu Mecklenburg (14 March 1933 – 23 July 2018) was a German historian of music and art.  He served as director of the Museum of the Roman Catholic Diocese of Rottenburg-Stuttgart for a period of 18 years, and was noted for his books on music and art.  He was a member of the former Mecklenburg ducal family.

Early life and education
Herzog zu Mecklenburg was born on 14 March 1933 in Remplin, Mecklenburg, in the northeast of Germany.  Although he was born on the former grand ducal estate, his relative Frederick Francis IV abdicated from rule in 1918 upon the defeat of the German Empire in World War I.  Thus, Herzog zu Mecklenburg (() serves as a surname, rather than a current title.  His father was George, Duke of Mecklenburg, and his mother was Irina Mikhailovna Raievskya.

Herzog zu Mecklenburg spent his early years at Remplin Palace, until the palace was burned in 1940.  His family then moved to the Berlin area until the end of the war.  In 1945, the family moved to Sigmaringen and Hechingen, in southwestern Germany, where Mecklenburg remained for much of the rest of his life.

Herzog zu Mecklenburg stayed in the area for his education.  He studied music at the Zimmermann Conservatory in Konstanz.  He then went on to the University of Tübingen, where he completed a masters degree in art history and musicology in 1964, and a PhD in art history in 1968.

Career
After completing his PhD, Herzog zu Mecklenburg worked as an assistant  in the department of art history at the University of Stuttgart.  He then served at the State Monument Preservation office in Tübingen.  As a member of this commission, he helped campaign to save the castle and other historic buildings of Hechingen.  In 1974 he was appointed the director of the Museum of the Roman Catholic Diocese of Rottenburg-Stuttgart, a position that he held until his retirement in 1992.

Herzog zu Mecklenburg is noted for his bibliographies on musical literature, particularly those on jazz.

Personal life and death
Herzog zu Mecklenburg married Princess Maria Margarethe of Hohenzollern, the daughter of Franz Joseph, Prince of Hohenzollern-Emden, in a civil ceremony on 18 February 1965 in Hechingen. They had a religious ceremony on 23 April 1966 in the Chapel at Burg Hohenzollern.

Herzog zu Mecklenburg died on 24 July 2018 at the age of 85, in his home at the Villa Silberburg in Hechingen.

Selected books

Ancestry

References

External links
 
 House of Mecklenburg-Strelitz website

1933 births
2018 deaths
House of Mecklenburg-Strelitz
German art historians
University of Tübingen alumni
Directors of museums in Germany
German male non-fiction writers
German music historians
20th-century German male writers
People from Mecklenburgische Seenplatte (district)